Polish National Radio Symphony Orchestra (NOSPR), is one of Poland's radio orchestra and premier musical institutions. It was founded in 1935 in Warsaw. In 1945 the orchestra was re-established in Katowice and since 2006 it has become a "National Cultural Institution".

History
The symphonic orchestra was created in 1935 and led by Grzegorz Fitelberg until the outbreak of World War II. In March 1945 Witold Rowicki revived the orchestra in Katowice. In 1947, Grzegorz Fitelberg, upon his return from abroad, took over the post of the artistic director. After his death in 1953, the orchestra was headed in succession by Jan Krenz, Bohdan Wodiczko, Kazimierz Kord, Tadeusz Strugała, Jerzy Maksymiuk, Stanisław Wisłocki, Jacek Kaspszyk, Antoni Wit, Gabriel Chmura and, once again, Jacek Kaspszyk. In September 2000, Joanna Wnuk-Nazarowa was appointed the general and programme director. From 2012 to August 2019 Alexander Liebreich was Chief Conductor and Artistic Director of the NOSPR.cv
In September 2018, Ewa Bogusz-Moore took up the post of General and Programme Director of the NOSPR. From September 2019 maestro Lawrence Foster is Chief Conductor and Artistic Director of the NOSPR. In 2019, the orchestra also joined the European Concert Hall Organisation (ECHO), which includes European concert halls who collaborate in the interests of enhancing audiences, exploring music repertoire and stimulating music practice at all levels.

Recordings 

The orchestra has recorded more than 198 compact discs for many Polish and foreign labels (Decca, EMI, Philips, etc.) and made numerous archival recordings for the needs of Polish Radio. For the Naxos label they recorded among others complete works of Witold Lutosławski (9 CDs), all symphonies of Tchaikowsky, Schumann, most of Penderecki's (I-V), Mahler's (except for VIII), as well as works of Wojciech Kilar, Henryk Wieniawski, Maurice Moszkowski and Henryk Górecki and for Chandos Records they made a three record album with music of Mieczysław Weinberg. Recorded by PNRSO K. Penderecki's Credo, H. M. Górecki's Symphony No. 3 and W. Kilar's Missa pro pace were released on DVD and SACD by Polish Radio as The Sacred Triptych.

For phonographic achievements the orchestra was honoured with numerous prizes: among others, Karol Szymanowski: Stabat Mater was chosen Record of the Year by the Gramophone magazine in 1985, five piano concertos by Prokofiev under direction of Antoni Wit with the soloist Kun Woo Paik were awarded the Diapason d'Or and the Grand Prix du Disque de la Nouvelle Académie du Disque 1992 and the recording of Turangalila Symphony by Olivier Messiaen under Antoni Wit was awarded the 2002 Cannes Classical Award. In 2002, 2004 and 2007, the orchestra won the Fryderyk Awards for Album of the Year - Archival Recording for Polish Conductors: Jan Krenz, Polish Conductors: Grzegorz Fitelberg and Polish Conductors: Henryk Czyż respectively. 

A record for DUX with works of Krzysztof Penderecki (Capriccio for violin and orchestra, De natura sonoris no. 2 for the piano and orchestra, Resurrection) with participation of NOSPR as well as soloists Beata Bilińska and Patrycja Piekutowska conducted by the composer received prestigious MIDEM Classical Award 2008 in the category of Contemporary Music. In 2017, the orchestra received the ICMA Award in the best collection category for Szymanowski: Overture op. 12, Lutoslawski: Cello Concerto, Symphony No. 4 while in 2018, the orchestra also received the ICMA Special Achievement Award. 

The Polish National Radio Symphony Orchestra has collaborated with many world-famous soloists and conductors including: Martha Argerich, Leonard Bernstein, Krzysztof Penderecki, Artur Rubinstein, Mstislav Rostropovich, Krystian Zimerman, Rudolf Buchbinder, James Conlon, Boris Belkin, Placido Domingo,  Nicolai Gedda, Barbara Hendricks, Kevin Kenner, Wilhelm Kempff, Paweł Klecki, Kirill Kondrashin, Witold Lutosławski, Charles Mackerras, Mischa Maisky, Neville Marriner, Kurt Masur, Shlomo Mintz, Ivan Monighetti, Garrick Ohlsson, Anne-Sophie Mutter, Hermann Prey, Ruggiero Ricci, Thomas Schippers, Stanisław Skrowaczewski, Isaac Stern, Henryk Szeryng, İdil Biret, Marzena Diakun and Pieter Wispelwey.

The new seat of the orchestra
The construction of the building started in 2012 and was completed in 2014. The Polish National Radio Symphony Orchestra in Katowice has been operating in the new building located at Wojciech Kilar Square since 1 October 2014. The cost of the project is estimated at 305 million zlotys (ca. US$80 million) and contains a main concert hall with a seating capacity of 1800 and a smaller one for 300 concert-goers. It is among the largest and most modern music venues in Poland and the world. In 2014, around 154,219 music lovers attended concerts in the newly-build seat of the orchestra 
The venue is situated in the post-industrial area of Katowice formerly belonging to KWK Katowice coal mine. The building was designed by Polish architect Tomasz Konior and his team, while the acoustics of the concert hall were designed by world-renowned Japanese acoustician Yasuhisa Toyota who works for Nagata Acoustics Company.
NOSPR, from April 2019 The European Concert Hall Organisation (ECHO), an organisation of Europe’s best concert halls.

See also
Warsaw Philharmonic
Sinfonia Varsovia
National Forum of Music
Szczecin Philharmonic
Music of Poland

References

External links
 

Musical groups established in 1935
Musical groups established in 1945
Polish orchestras
Radio and television orchestras
Polskie Radio
Tourist attractions in Silesian Voivodeship
Concert halls in Poland